The Densu River is a 116 km long river in Ghana rising in the Atewa Range. It flows through an economically important agricultural region, supplies half the drinking water to Ghana's capital city of Accra, and ends in an ecologically significant wetlands at the edge of the Atlantic Ocean. The Densuano Dam and Weija Dam are situated on the Densu River.

Densu Basin 

The population density of the Densu Basin is approximately 240 persons per square kilometer.

In popular culture 
 Ghanaian artist Kojo Antwi named his second studio album, released in 2002, after the river.
 Osibisa, an Afrobeat band, composed a song titled Densu, explaining about the different varieties of fishes and the song the fishermen sing.

Threats 
Part of the Densu River has become a dumping site by some residents in the area, aside dumping of refuse which is causing water pollution, farmers also farm close to the river, there other activities such as sand winning and quarrying activities around

References

Rivers of Ghana
Ramsar sites in Ghana